The Pingxi Line is a 12.9 km long, single-track railway branch line of the Taiwan Railways Administration. It runs through Ruifang and Pingxi Districts in New Taipei City.

History
The railroad was originally built to transport coal. It was completed in July 1921, during Japanese rule.

Services
All trains have through service to the Yilan Line. Most trains terminate at either Houtong or Ruifang. Other trains go as far as Badu.

Stations

Gallery

References

External links

1921 establishments in Taiwan
TRA routes
Railway lines opened in 1921
3 ft 6 in gauge railways in Taiwan